The Journal of PeriAnesthesia Nursing is a quarterly peer-reviewed healthcare journal of perianesthesia nursing.

It is the official journal of the American Society of PeriAnesthesia Nurses. It is indexed in CINAHL and Scopus.

See also
 List of nursing journals

Perioperative nursing journals
Elsevier academic journals
Quarterly journals
English-language journals